Elwyn Aubrey Walters (born 25 June 1943) is an Australian former rugby league footballer who played for South Sydney and Eastern Suburbs clubs and for the Australian national side.

Walters came to South Sydney in the mid-1960s from the Brisbane Norths club. He was a tough  noted for his dummy half play and uncompromising defence.

Club career
He won five premierships, three with Souths (1967, 1968 and 1970) and two with Eastern Suburbs (1974 and 1975). Walters missed the premiership victory by Souths in the 1971 grand final through injury.
During the 1976 NSWRFL season, Walters played in the forwards, helping Eastern Suburbs to victory in their unofficial 1976 World Club Challenge match against British champions St. Helens in Sydney.

Walters played 129 games for South Sydney, 58 matches for Eastern Suburbs and 5 games for Manly.

In 2004 he was named by Souths in their South Sydney Dream Team, consisting of 17 players and a coach representing the club from 1908 through to 2004.

Representative career
Whilst playing for South Sydney, Walters was selected to represent Australia on two Kangaroo tours of Great Britain and France (1968 and 1973) and for two World Cup tournaments (1970 and 1972).

He represented NSW in 11 matches and played in 12 test matches for Australia.

Sources
 Andrews, Malcolm (2006) The ABC of Rugby League, Austn Broadcasting Corpn, Sydney

Footnotes

External links
Kangaroos beat Lions at Wilderspool

1943 births
Living people
Australia national rugby league team players
Australian rugby league players
City New South Wales rugby league team players
Manly Warringah Sea Eagles players
New South Wales rugby league team players
Norths Devils players
Rugby league hookers
Rugby league players from Murwillumbah
Rugby league second-rows
South Sydney Rabbitohs players
Sydney Roosters players